Coleophora flavicornis is a moth of the family Coleophoridae. It is found in Mongolia.

The larvae feed on Caragana bungei. They feed on the leaves of their host plant.

References

flavicornis
Moths described in 1995
Moths of Asia